Gregg Marx (born April 3, 1955) is an American actor known mainly for his work on daytime soap operas.

He first played the role of David Banning on Days of Our Lives from 1981 to 1983. He then moved to As the World Turns where he portrayed Tom Hughes, from December 7, 1984 to 1987. Marx won the Daytime Emmy Award for Outstanding Supporting Actor in a Drama Series at the 14th Daytime Emmy Awards in 1987.

As a cabaret performer, he as performed at Los Angeles venues such as Hollywood Cinegrill, Masquers Cabaret, The Gardenia, and Feinstein's At The Cinegrill, as well as in New York at Danny's Skylight Room, Maggiano's at The Grove and II Moro Supper Club.

He voiced a fictional commercial in an episode of Two and a Half Men in 2007.

Gregg Marx is a grandson of Gummo Marx of the Marx Brothers.

References

General references

External links 
 

1955 births
Living people
Jewish American male actors
American male soap opera actors
Daytime Emmy Award winners
Daytime Emmy Award for Outstanding Supporting Actor in a Drama Series winners
American people of German-Jewish descent

21st-century American Jews